Ardozyga gypsocrana is a species of moth in the family Gelechiidae. It was described by Turner in 1919. It is found in Australia, where it has been recorded from Queensland.

The forewings are whitish irrorated with pale-fuscous. The stigmata are rather large, ill-defined, the plical beyond the first discal. The hindwings are whitish.

References

Ardozyga
Moths described in 1919
Moths of Australia